Ullin Thomas Place (24 October 1924 – 2 January 2000), usually cited as U. T. Place, was a British philosopher and psychologist. Along with J. J. C. Smart, he developed the identity theory of mind. After several years at the University of Adelaide, he taught for some years in the Department of Philosophy in the University of Leeds.

Life 
Place was born in Northallerton, Yorkshire. He was educated at Rugby School and Corpus Christi College, Oxford. He studied under and was strongly influenced by Gilbert Ryle at Oxford University. There, he became acquainted with philosophy of mind in the logical behaviorist tradition, of which Ryle was a major exponent. Although he would later abandon logical behaviorism as a theory of the mind in favor of the type-identity theory, Place nevertheless continued to harbor sympathies toward the behavioristic approach to psychology in general. He even went so far as to defend the radical behaviorist theses of B.F. Skinner, as expressed in Verbal Behavior, from the criticisms of Noam Chomsky and the growing movement of cognitive psychology. Place died in Thirsk, Yorkshire.

Place, as well as J. J. C. Smart, nevertheless established his place in the annals of analytic philosophy by founding the theory which would eventually help to dethrone and displace philosophical behaviorism - the identity theory. In Is Consciousness a Brain Process?, Place formulated the thesis that mental processes were not to be defined in terms of behavior; rather, one must identify them with neural states. With this bold thesis, Place became one of the fathers of the current materialistic mainstream of the philosophy of mind.

His sister, Dorothy E. Smith, is a prominent Canadian sociologist and the founder of the field of institutional ethnography, and his brother, Milner Place, is one of England's leading poets.

Place's identity theory vs. that of Feigl and Smart 
There are actually subtle but interesting differences between the three most widely credited formulations of the type identity thesis, those of Place, Feigl and Smart which were published in several articles in the late 1950s. Place's notion of the identity involved in the identity thesis is derived from Bertrand Russell's distinction among several types of is statements: the is of identity, the is of equality and the is of predication. Place's version of the relation of identity in the so-called identity thesis is more accurately described as an asymmetric relation of composition. For Place, higher-level mental events are composed out of lower-level physical events and will eventually be analytically reduced to these. To the objection that "sensations" do not mean the same thing as "brain processes", Place could simply reply with the example that "lightning" does not mean the same thing as "electrical discharge" since we determine that something is lightning by looking and seeing it, whereas we determine that something is an electrical discharge through experimentation and testing. Nevertheless, "lightning is an electrical discharge" is true since the one is composed of the other. Similarly, "clouds are water vapor" means that "clouds are composed of droplets of water vapor" but not vice versa.

For Feigl and Smart, on the other hand, the identity was to be interpreted as the identity between the referents of two descriptions (senses) which referred to the same thing, as in "the morning star" and "the evening star" both referring to Venus. So to the objection about the lack of equality of meaning between "sensation" and "brain process", their response was to invoke this Fregean distinction: "sensations" and "brain" processes do indeed mean different things but they refer to the same physical phenomenon. Moreover, "sensations are brain processes" is a contingent, not a necessary, identity.

Works 
 Identifying the mind. Selected papers, OUP, Oxford 2004, 
 "Is consciousness a brain process?" in: British Journal of Psychology 47 (1956), pp. 44–50
  "Skinner's Verbal Behavior - why we need it" in: Behaviorism, 1981.

Notes

References 
 J. Franklin, Corrupting the Youth: A History of Philosophy in Australia, 2003, ch. 9.
 D.C. Palmer, In memoriam Ullin place: 1924–2000, BEHAV ANALYST (2000) 23: 95

External links 
Ullin Thomas Place (1924-2000). Philosopher and psychologist. The intellectual legacy of a radical empiricist, complete bibliography with download links, compiled and edited by Thomas Place.

20th-century British philosophers
Philosophers of mind
English philosophers
1924 births
2000 deaths
Analytic philosophers
People educated at Rugby School
Alumni of Corpus Christi College, Oxford